

Spring Training 
The Phillies held spring training in 1891 in Cape May, New Jersey where the team stayed at the Aldine Hotel. The team had planned to practice at the Cape May Athletic Field, where the team held spring training 1888. Finding it unfit, the Phillies instead practiced on the Gas House field. It was the second of three seasons the Phillies trained in Cape May.

Regular season

Season standings

Record vs. opponents

Roster

Player stats

Batting

Starters by position 
Note: Pos = Position; G = Games played; AB = At bats; H = Hits; Avg. = Batting average; HR = Home runs; RBI = Runs batted in

Other batters 
Note: G = Games played; AB = At bats; H = Hits; Avg. = Batting average; HR = Home runs; RBI = Runs batted in

Pitching

Starting pitchers 
Note: G = Games pitched; IP = Innings pitched; W = Wins; L = Losses; ERA = Earned run average; SO = Strikeouts

Other pitchers 
Note: G = Games pitched; IP = Innings pitched; W = Wins; L = Losses; ERA = Earned run average; SO = Strikeouts

Relief pitchers 
Note: G = Games pitched; W = Wins; L = Losses; SV = Saves; ERA = Earned run average; SO = Strikeouts

References 

1891 Philadelphia Phillies season at Baseball Reference

Philadelphia Phillies seasons
Philadelphia Phillies season
Philly